Jooseph Stanislas François Xavier Alexis Rovère de Fontvielle, born 16 July 1748 in Bonnieux ( Vaucluse ), died 11 September 1798 in Sinnamary, French Guiana, was a general and politician of the French Revolution .

People from Vaucluse
Presidents of the National Convention
1748 births
1798 deaths